A bus trap (car trap in the UK) is a metal grate placed over a ditch or pit in the road with tines (sides) spaced far enough apart that small (shorter axle) vehicles fall between the tines but close enough that larger-diameter-wheeled vehicles, such as buses, may pass.  Cycles may cross broader sided examples.

Different versions exist for restricting access.  The tines cross the path of the road, not parallel with the road direction.  Small-wheeled vehicles bottom out in between the tines, preventing the vehicle from continuing over the obstacle.

Deprecation and preferred alternatives
Many domestic vehicles exist in the 21st century wide enough to navigate bus traps effectively, including wide-axle SUVs and 4x4s. Police cars and in some cases motorbikes are hindered by bus traps. Most cities favour other means of keeping cars out of bus-only areas, such as:
fines backed up with camera enforcement
a controlled barrier, such as a rising clearly marked bollard kept in a default risen state — may use radio-frequency identification

Examples

The city of Calgary, Canada, began installation of bus traps in 1970s and primarily used them to restrict access to transit facilities and neighborhoods attempting to discourage pass-through traffic. The last seven bus traps are scheduled to be removed in 2022.

See also
 Sump buster
 Cattle grid

References

Road infrastructure